The ICFTU Asia and Pacific Regional Organisation (APRO) was a regional organisation of the International Confederation of Free Trade Unions (ICFTU), representing trade unions from countries in Asia and Oceania.

History
The federation was founded in May 1951 at a meeting in Karachi, as the Asian Regional Organisation.  It was initially based in Calcutta, but moved to New Delhi in 1956, and then Singapore in 1988.  In 1984 it changed its name to the ICFTU-Asia Pacific Regional Organisation.  In 2007, following the merger of the ICFTU and the World Confederation of Labour (WCL), the organisation merged with the WCL's Brotherhood of Asian Trade Unions, to form the ITUC Regional Organisation for Asia and Pacific.

In 2006, the organisation described its aims thus:

The organisation seeks to bring about a just, welfare society with a higher standard of living. It believes that promoting a higher wage policy and the dignity and status of workers through a stronger trade union movement will help achieve this. Equipping workers with the skills to fight for fundamental rights, including the setting up of bona fide trade unions is perhaps its major undertaking. Under its current structure, ICFTU-APRO tackles education, information, social and economic policy, women, human and trade union rights and youth among its areas of work.

Affiliates
The following national organisations were affiliated to ICFTU-APRO in 2006:
Australia
Australian Council of Trade Unions
Bangladesh
Bangladesh Free Trade Union Congress
Bangladesh Jatiyatabadi Sramik Dal
Bangladesh Labour Federation
Jatiya Sramik League
Republic of China (Taiwan)
Chinese Federation of Labour
Cook Islands
Cook Islands Workers Association Incorporated
Fiji
Fiji Trades Union Congress
French Polynesia
A Tia I Mua
Hong Kong
Hong Kong Confederation of Trade Unions
Hong Kong & Kowloon Trades Union Council
India
Hind Mazdoor Sabha
Indian National Trade Union Congress
Israel
General Federation of Labour in Israel
Japan
Japanese Trade Union Confederation
Jordan
The General Federation of Jordanian Trade Unions
Kiribati
Kiribati Trades Union Congress
South Korea
Federation of Korean Trade Unions
Korean Confederation of Trade Unions
Malaysia
Malaysian Trades Union Congress
Mongolia
Confederation of Mongolian Trade Unions
Nepal
Nepal Trade Union Congress
New Caledonia
Union Des Syndicates des Oudriers et Employes de Nouvelle Caledonie
New Zealand
New Zealand Council of Trade Unions
Pakistan
All Pakistan Federation of Labour
All Pakistan Federation of Trade Unions
Pakistan National Federation of Trade Unions
Papua New Guinea
Papua New Guinea Trade Union Congress
Philippines
Trade Union Congress of Philippines
Samoa
Samoa Trades Union Congress
Singapore
National Trades Union Congress
Sri Lanka
Ceylon Workers' Congress
Thailand
Labour Congress of Thailand
Thai Trade Union Congress
Tonga
Friendly Islands Teachers' Association
Turkey
Confederation of Revolutionary Trade Unions of Turkey
Confederation of Turkish Trade Unions
The Confederation of Turkish Real Trade Unions
Confederation of Public Servants Trade Unions
Vanuatu
Vanuatu Council of Trade Unions

Leadership

General Secretaries
1951: Dhyan Mungat
1956: Govardhan Mapara
1966: V. S. Mathur
1988: Takashi Izumi
2000: Noriyuki Suzuki

Presidents
1953: Robert Edward Jayatilaka
1955: Jose J. Hernandez
1960: P. P. Narayanan
1965: Haruo Wada
1968: Minoru Takita
1969: P. P. Narayanan
1976: Devan Nair
1982: Tadanobu Usami
1988: Gopeshwar
1994: Ken Douglas
2000: Sharan Burrow
2005: Govindasamy Rajasekaran

References

 
International organizations based in Asia
International organizations based in Oceania
Trade unions established in 1951
Trade unions disestablished in 2007
1951 establishments in Pakistan